KLAX-TV (channel 31) is a television station in Alexandria, Louisiana, United States, affiliated with ABC and owned by Imagicomm Communications. The station's studios are located on England Drive/LA 498 in Alexandria, and its transmitter is located in the Kisatchie National Forest southwest of Dry Prong.

History
Plans for KLAX began in late 1979 when Jim Richards, who owned KSYL radio, formed Cypress Communications with the intent on launching a new television station on one of the two available commercial UHF stations (channel 31 or 41). Although the station planned to sign on in 1981 as an ABC affiliate, there were numerous delays with ordering proper equipment, and ABC originally rejected KLAX's affiliation. KLAX was launched on March 3, 1983, originally operating as an independent station, airing a mixture of syndicated programming, movies, and for a short period of time, a prime time newscast.

On September 23, 1985, it became the area's ABC affiliate with Monday Night Football serving as the first program that the station aired as a network affiliate. Prior to this, area cable companies had piped in either WBRZ from Baton Rouge or KATC out of Lafayette, and local station KALB-TV (channel 5) had a secondary affiliation with ABC. Fortunes soon eroded for Cypress Communications over debts accrued during construction of KLAX, and the station was put up for sale in 1986 with former KPLC owner Russell Chambers seeking a co-ownership with Rollins Inc., but this deal fell through. Cypress Communications filed Chapter 11 bankruptcy protection in May 1987, and then they sold the station to Pollack/Belz Broadcasting on June 3, 1988.

KLAX became one of two default ABC affiliates for the Monroe area (along with KTBS) in 1994 after that city's former ABC affiliate, KARD, became a Fox station. Most cable companies in the Monroe area carried KLAX, and it briefly branded itself as "Louisiana's Superstation" to capitalize on its expanded footprint into Monroe. This situation continued until 1998 when KAQY signed-on and took the ABC affiliation. During this time, due to Syndex rules, programming airing on other stations in Monroe was replaced by CNN Headline News.

KLAX also had a secondary affiliation with UPN from January 1995 until 2000 when sister station KWCE-LP signed-on (when UPN shut down and merged with The WB to form The CW in September 2006, KWCE-LP joined Retro TV). KLAX-TV upgraded its master control to allow the broadcast of high definition programming in 2012, becoming one of the last ABC affiliates and major network stations in the United States to upgrade from standard definition. Concurrent with the upgrade, KLAX-TV took on a MeTV affiliation on both its second digital subchannel and KWCE-LP.

During November 2016, KLAX's high-power transmitter received a power surge, rendering it unusable. Until late February 2018, when the station installed a new transmitter, KLAX broadcast over the air with a signal from its low-powered transmitter, making it difficult to receive over the air in the Greater Central Louisiana area.

Pollack/Belz Broadcasting agreed to sell KLAX-TV and KWCE-LP to Lost Coast Broadcasting, a subsidiary of Northwest Broadcasting, for $3.5 million on April 6, 2018. The sale was completed on August 31. In early 2019, Lost Coast added Ion Television programming to a newly created third subchannel.

In February 2019, Reuters reported that Apollo Global Management had agreed to acquire the entirety of Brian Brady's television portfolio, which it intends to merge with Cox Media Group (which Apollo is acquiring at the same time) and stations spun off from Nexstar Media Group's purchase of Tribune Broadcasting, once the purchases are approved by the FCC. In March 2019 filings with the FCC, Apollo confirmed that its newly-formed broadcasting group, Terrier Media, would acquire Northwest Broadcasting, with Brian Brady holding an unspecified minority interest in Terrier. In June 2019, it was announced that Terrier Media would instead operate as Cox Media Group, as Apollo had reached a deal to also acquire Cox's radio and advertising businesses. The transaction was completed on December 17.

On March 29, 2022, Cox Media Group announced it would sell KLAX-TV and 17 other stations to Imagicomm Communications, an affiliate of the parent company of the INSP cable channel, for $488 million; the sale was completed on August 1.

Newscasts

KLAX has made many attempts in broadcasting local news ever since signing on in 1983. Its first attempt, known as Prime News 31, premiered in October 1983 and lasted approximately one year. Said newscast aired at 9 p.m. local time, one hour before most evening newscasts. The station planned a new newscast shortly after gaining an ABC affiliation but scrapped the plan as Cypress Communications' fortunes eroded; however, in October 1986, KLAX premiered a morning newscast called Sun-Up and a news-talk show called Good Company, which aired prior to ABC World News Tonight. KLAX's longest-running and fully staffed local news department began October 3, 1988 shortly after it was acquired by Pollack-Belz. This newscast, called Cenla 31 First News, aired at 5 and 10 p.m., and eventually expanded into 6 p.m., as well. The newscast later became known as 31 LAX Action News on September 10, 1996, and it was known as that until full-length newscasts were discontinued on March 1, 2001 in a cost-cutting measure and replaced by short-form news and weather updates (as well as various syndicated programming, such as Louie Anderson's Family Feud [in the 6 p.m. hour] and Mama's Family [in the 10 p.m. hour]); the news operation was unable to compete with longtime dominant KALB, and was eventually discontinued by 2002. For the next five years, weather updates occasionally aired in between syndicated programs.

On February 5, 2007, the Independent News Network (INN) began to produce weeknight newscasts for KLAX (branded as ABC 31 News). The news anchor, meteorologist, and sports anchor are provided by the centralized news operation and other personnel from INN can fill-in as necessary. KLAX maintains local reporters who contribute content to newscasts seen weeknights at 6 and 10. The shows are taped in advance and originate from INN's facility on Tremont Avenue in Davenport, Iowa until INN moved to Little Rock, Arkansas in 2013. KLAX's only live newscast aired  at 6 p.m. and is repeated at 10 p.m.  At the beginning of 2019, KLAX's newscasts no longer used INN's services and are instead produced by the Delta News staff out of sister station WABG and the cluster of Northwest Broadcasting's stations in the Greenwood, Mississippi market with local reporters remaining in Alexandria.

Subchannels
The station's digital signal is multiplexed:

References

External links

Television channels and stations established in 1983
1983 establishments in Louisiana
KLAX-TV
ABC network affiliates
MeTV affiliates
Ion Television affiliates
Imagicomm Communications